The PSLV-C49 is the 51st mission of the Indian Polar Satellite Launch Vehicle (PSLV) and second flight in 'DL' configuration. The Polar Satellite Launch Vehicle (PSLV)-C49 was successfully launched from Second Launch Pad, Satish Dhawan Space Centre on November 7, 2020, at 9:41 (UTC) /15:11 (IST) carrying EOS-01 along with nine international customer satellites.

Mission overview
 Propellant:
 Stage 1: Composite Solid
 Stage 2: Earth Storable Liquid
 Stage 3: Composite Solid
 Stage 4: Earth Storable Liquid

The PSLV-C49 rocket has four stages; each one was self-contained, with its own propulsion system, thereby capable of functioning independently. The first and third stages used composite solid propellants, while the second and fourth stage use earth-storable liquid propellant

References 

Polar Satellite Launch Vehicle
Spacecraft launched by India in 2020
November 2020 events in India
Rocket launches in 2020